Aviv Regev (born July 11, 1971) is a computational biologist and systems biologist and Executive Vice President and Head of Genentech Research and Early Development in Genentech/Roche. She is a core member (on leave) at the Broad Institute of MIT and Harvard and professor (on leave) at the Department of Biology of the Massachusetts Institute of Technology. Regev is a pioneer of single cell genomics and of computational and systems biology of gene regulatory circuits. She founded and leads the Human Cell Atlas project, together with Sarah Teichmann.

Education
Regev studied at the Adi Lautman Interdisciplinary Program for Outstanding Students of Tel Aviv University, where she completed her Ph.D. under the supervision of Eva Jablonka and Ehud Shapiro.

Career and research
In 2020, Regev became the Head and Executive Vice President of Genentech Research and Early Development, based in South San Francisco, and a member of the extended Corporate Executive Committee of Roche. Previously, she was a Core Institute Member (now on leave), Chair of the Faculty, Founding Director of the Klarman Cell Observatory and co-Director Cell Circuits Program at the Broad Institute of MIT and Harvard. She was also a professor in the Department of Biology at the Massachusetts Institute of Technology (now on leave), as well as an Investigator at the Howard Hughes Medical Institute. Regev's research includes work on gene expression (with Eran Segal and David Botstein), and the use of π-calculus to represent biochemical processes. Regev's team has been a leading pioneer of single-cell genomics experimental and computational methods. In 2014, she pitched the idea of the creation of Human Cell Atlas,  a project to describe all cell types in the human body. Regev founded the Human Cell Atlas together with Sarah Teichmann along with collaborators all over the world.

Single Cell Genomics 
Regev's lab pioneered the development and application of many of the key experimental and computational advances for single cell and spatial genomics, especially single cell RNA-Seq (scRNA-seq).

Awards and honors 
Regev is a fellow of the International Society of Computational Biology (ISCB) (2017), a Helmholtz Fellow (2020), and a fellow of the American Association for Cancer Research (AACR) (2021). She is a member of the US National Academy of Sciences (NAS, elected 2019) and of the US National Academy of Medicine (NAM, elected 2020).
 Regev was awarded the Overton Prize in 2008 for "outstanding accomplishment to a scientist in the early to mid stage of his or her career". 
 In 2008, she was also awarded the NIH Director's Pioneer Award.
 She has also been awarded the Burroughs Wellcome Fund Career Award. 
 Earl and Thressa Stadtman Scholar Award from the American Society of Biochemistry and Molecular Biology (ASBMB) (2014) 
 She was awarded the ISCB Innovator Award in 2017. 
 In 2017, she was awarded a Paul Marks Prize for Cancer Research. 
 McCormick Lecture, Stanford University (2018)
 Harvey Lecture, Harvey Society, New York (2018) 
 Weatherall Lecture, University Oxford, UK (2018) 
 She also served on the Life Sciences jury for the Infosys Prize in 2018.
 She was elected a member of the National Academy of Sciences (NAS) in 2019. 
 FASEB Excellence in Science Mid-Career Investigator Award (2019) 
 She was awarded the 25th Keio Medical Science Prize in 2020.
 Jonathan Kraft Prize from Massachusetts General Hospital (2020)
 Mendel Lecture, European Society of Human Genetics (2020)
 Lurie Prize from the Foundation for the NIH (FNIH) (2020)
 AACR-Irving Weinstein Foundation Distinguished Lecture (2021)
 25th Keio Medical Science Prize (2020)
 Vanderbilt Prize (2021)
 James Prize in Science and Technology Integration, National Academy of Sciences (2021)
 Ernst Schering Prize (2021)
 Honorary doctorate, ETH Zurich (2021)
 Nakasone Award from the Human Frontiers Science Program (2022)
 Anderson Lecture, University of Virginia, 2022
 Elected to the American Academy of Arts and Sciences, 2022

References

Living people
Computational biologists
Systems biologists
Israeli bioinformaticians
Massachusetts Institute of Technology School of Science faculty
Overton Prize winners
Howard Hughes Medical Investigators
Tel Aviv University alumni
Fellows of the International Society for Computational Biology
Adi Lautman Interdisciplinary Program for Outstanding Students alumni
Members of the United States National Academy of Sciences
Genentech people
Women computational biologists
1970 births